Nikos Zourkos (born 27 October 1989) is a Greek professional footballer who plays as an attacking midfielder for Football League club Veria.

References

1989 births
Living people
Greek footballers
Football League (Greece) players
Gamma Ethniki players
Naoussa F.C. players
Aiginiakos F.C. players
Veria F.C. players
Association football midfielders
People from Krya Vrysi, Pella
Footballers from Central Macedonia